Crocus hartmannianus is a species of flowering plant in the genus Crocus of the family Iridaceae. It is a cormous perennial native to Cyprus.

Plants inhabit the Troodos Mountains where it is rare, flowering occurs in mid February. Closely related to Crocus cyprius, but differentiated by its coarser paralleled fibered corm tunics.

References

hartmannianus